Sagebrush Politics is a 1930 American silent Western film with sound sequences, directed by Denver Dixon, starring Art Mix, Wally Merrill, and Lilian Bond.

Cast
 Art Mix as Tom Williams
 Lilian Bond as Sheriff's Daughter
 Gilbert Holmes as Joe Morgan 
 William Ryno as Wolf
 Wally Merrill as Henchman 
 Stuart Morgan Dancers
 Jim Campbell as Jim 
 Tom Forman

References

1930 films
1930 Western (genre) films
Silent American Western (genre) films
American black-and-white films
Films directed by Victor Adamson
1930s English-language films
1930s American films